The Austrian pavilion is a national pavilion of the Venice Biennale. It houses Austria's official representation during the Biennale.

Background 

The Venice Biennale is an international art biennial exhibition held in Venice, Italy. Often described as "the Olympics of the art world", the Biennale is a prestigious event for contemporary artists known for propelling career visibility. The festival has become a constellation of shows: a central exhibition curated by that year's artistic director, national pavilions hosted by individual nations, and independent exhibitions throughout Venice. The Biennale parent organization also hosts regular festivals in other arts: architecture, dance, film, music, and theater.

Outside of the central, international exhibition, individual nations produce their own shows, known as pavilions, as their national representation. Nations that own their pavilion buildings, such as the 30 housed on the Giardini, are responsible for their own upkeep and construction costs as well. Nations without dedicated buildings create pavilions in venues throughout the city.

Organization and building 

The Austrian pavilion was designed by the Vienna Secession co-founding architect Josef Hoffmann, whose submission won a contest. Though designs for the pavilion trace to 1913, construction was not completed until 1934. The building was restored in 1984 by Hans Hollein.

Representation by year

Art 

 1978 — Arnulf Rainer (Commissioner: Hans Hollein)
 1980 — Valie Export, Maria Lassnig (Commissioner: Hans Hollein)
 1982 — Walter Pichler (Commissioner: Hans Hollein)
 1984 — Christian Ludwig Attersee (Commissioner: Hans Hollein)
 1986 — Max Peintner, Karl Prantl (Commissioner: Hans Hollein)
 1988 — Siegfried Anzinger (Commissioner: Hans Hollein)
 1990 — Franz West (Commissioner: Hans Hollein)
 1993 — Gerwald Rockenschaub, Andrea Fraser, Christian Philipp Müller (Commissioner: Peter Weibel)
 1995 — Coop Himmelb(l)au, Peter Kogler, Richard Kriesche, Peter Sandbichler / Constanze Ruhm, Eva Schlegel, Ruth Schnell (Commissioner: Peter Weibel)
 1997 — Die Wiener Gruppe (Friedrich Achleitner, Konrad Bayer, Gerhard Rühm, Oswald Wiener) (Commissioner: Peter Weibel)
 1999 — Peter Friedl, Rainer Ganahl, Christine Hohenbüchler and Irene Hohenbüchler, Wochenklausur (Commissioner: Peter Weibel)
 2001 — Granular Synthesis (Ulf Langheinrich & Kurt Hentschläger), Gelatin (Commissioner: Elisabeth Schweeger)
 2003 — Bruno Gironcoli (Commissioner: Kasper König)
 2005 — Hans Schabus (Commissioner: Max Hollein)
 2007 — Herbert Brandl (Commissioner: Robert Fleck)
 2009 — Elke Krystufek, Dorit Margreiter, Lois & Franziska Weinberger (Commissioners: Valie Export and Silvia Eiblmayr)
 2011 — Markus Schinwald (Commissioner: Eva Schlegel)
 2013 — Mathias Poledna (Commissioner: Jasper Sharp)
 2015 — Heimo Zobernig (Commissioner: Yilmaz Dziewior)
 2017 — Brigitte Kowanz, Erwin Wurm (Commissioner: Christa Steinle)
 2019 — Renate Bertlmann (Curator: Felicitas Thun-Hohenstein)
 2022 — Jakob Lena Knebl and Ashley Hans Scheirl (Curator: Karola Klaus)

References

Bibliography

Further reading

External links 
 

National pavilions
Austrian contemporary art